Sphenarches cafferoides is a moth of the family Pterophoridae that is known from Madagascar.

References

Platyptiliini
Moths described in 1996
Endemic fauna of Madagascar
Moths of Madagascar